Thuna paha is a Sri Lankan curry powder.
It is a Sinhalese unroasted curry powder used to spice the curry dishes, especially vegetarian dishes. The name Thuna Paha roughly translates as "three or five" as traditionally it is made from three to five ingredients.

The main ingredients are cumin seeds, fennel seeds, coriander seeds; additional ingredients can include: curry leaves; cinnamon bark; cardamon seeds; black pepper (which is used to give this curry powder its heat); cloves; and pandanus leaves. As with many traditional Sri Lankan dishes there is no fixed recipe for Thuna paha, with regions/families using varying recipes containing different ratios of spices. The cardamom used is green or true cardamom ( or 'enasaal'), and the cinnamon used is Ceylon cinnamon ( or 'kurundu').

Preparation
The traditional method for preparing Thuna paha is where the spices are left to dry in the sun and then ground on a rectangular block of granite with a granite rolling-pin, known as a miris gala. The modern approach is to slowly dry roast the spices in a hot pan to remove any moisture and release their fragrances, then use a mechanical blender to blend the spices into a powder. Traditionalists maintain that manual grinding retains the aroma, flavour and nutritional benefits of the spices whereas when pulsed in a mechanical blender, some of the aroma, flavour and nutrients are lost.

The ground powder should be sealed in an airtight container and stored in a cool dark space until ready for use. Typically Thuna paha should last in this manner for 2-4 months.

Roasted thuna paha
Roasted Sinhalese curry powder, Badapu or Bathapu thuna paha, has more intense flavours than the unroasted or raw version, and is typically used in fish, meat, poultry and blackened vegetable dishes. It is also often sprinkled at the end of cooking to add a fragrant finish. The primary difference is that the spices are dry roasted until golden brown in colour, before being ground into a powder.

References 

Herb and spice mixtures
Powders
Sri Lankan condiments